The 73rd annual Venice International Film Festival was held from 31 August to 10 September 2016. English director Sam Mendes was the President of the Jury for the main competition. The opening night film was Damien Chazelle's musical La La Land. The Golden Lion was awarded to Lav Diaz's film The Woman Who Left.

A new project named Venice Production Bridge was introduced in this edition of the festival. The new project is intended to attract industry professionals and focus on original projects for films, internet, series, virtual reality, and works in progress, in order to help their development and production. It is also meant to work in conjunction with the Venice Film Market which started in 2012. Such projects as Final Cut in Venice, meant to help finance original films from African countries, and the Venice Gap-Financing Market will come under its scope.

Juries
The following people formed the 2016 juries:

Main competition (Venezia 73)
 Sam Mendes, English film and stage director (Jury President)
 Laurie Anderson, American artist, composer, musician and film director
 Gemma Arterton, English actress
 Giancarlo De Cataldo, Italian writer
 Nina Hoss, German actress
 Chiara Mastroianni, French-Italian actress
 Joshua Oppenheimer, American fim director
 Lorenzo Vigas, Venezuelan film director, screenwriter and producer
 Zhao Wei, Chinese actress, singer and film director

Horizons (Orizzonti)
 Robert Guédiguian, French film director, screenwriter, producer and actor (President)
 Jim Hoberman, American film critic and academic
 Nelly Karim, Egyptian actress, fashion model and ballerina
 Valentina Lodovini, Italian film and TV actress
 Moon So-ri, South Korean actress, film director and screenwriter
 José María (Chema) Prado, director of the Filmoteca Española
 Chaitanya Tamhane, Indian filmmaker

Opera Prima (Venice Award for a Debut Film)
 Kim Rossi Stuart, Italian actor and director (President)
 Rosa Bosch, Spanish-born film producer
 Brady Corbet, American actor and filmmaker
 Pilar López de Ayala, Spanish film actress
 Serge Toubiana, Tunisian-born journalist and film critic

Official selection

In competition
The following films were selected for the main competition:

Highlighted title indicates Golden Lion winner. - * indicates film eligible for the Queer Lion.

Out of Competition
The following films were selected to be screened out of competition

Horizons 
The following films were selected for the Horizons (Orizzonti) section:

Highlighted titles indicate Horizons Prize for Best Feature Film and Best Short Film winners respectively.
* indicates film eligible for the Queer Lion.

Venice Classics
The following films were selected to be screened in the Venice Classics section:

Highlighted titles indicate the Best Restored Film and Best Documentary on Cinema official awards respectively.

Biennale College - Cinema
The following films were selected for the Biennale College - Cinema section.

Final Cut in Venice
The following films were screened for the "Final Cut in Venice" section, a workshop to support the post-production of films from Africa:

Il Cinema nel Giardino
The following feature films were selected for the Il Cinema nel Giardino section:

Special screenings
The following film was presented as a Special Screening of the Official Selection:
 Spes contra Spem: Liberi Dentro (prison documentary) by Ambrogio Crespi

Autonomous sections

International Critics Week
The following films were selected for the International Critics Week section:

* indicates film eligible for the Queer Lion.

Venice Days
The following films were selected for the 13th edition of the Venice Days (Giornate degli Autori) section:

Highlighted title indicates the official Venice Days Award winner.
* indicates film eligible for the Queer Lion.

Awards

Official selection
The following official awards were presented at the 73rd edition:

In Competition (Venezia 73)
Golden Lion: The Woman Who Left (Ang Babaeng Humayo) by Lav Diaz
Grand Jury Prize: Nocturnal Animals by Tom Ford
Silver Lion for Best Director (ex-aequo):
Amat Escalante for The Untamed
Andrei Konchalovsky for Paradise
Volpi Cup for Best Actress: Emma Stone for La La Land
Volpi Cup for Best Actor: Oscar Martínez for The Distinguished Citizen
 Best Screenplay Award: Noah Oppenheim for Jackie
Special Jury Prize: The Bad Batch by Ana Lily Amirpour
Marcello Mastroianni Award: Paula Beer for her role in Frantz

Horizons (Orizzonti)
Best Film: Libera Nos by Federica Di Giacomo
Best Director: Home by Fien Troch
Special Jury Prize: Big Big World by Reha Erdem
Best Actress: Ruth Díaz for The Fury of a Patient Man
Best Actor: Nuno Lopes for Saint George
Best Screenplay: Bitter Money by Wang Bing
Horizons Prize for Best Short: La Voz Perdida by Marcelo Martinessi

Venice Classics Awards
Best Documentary on Cinema: The Graduation by Claire Simon
Best Restored Film: Break Up by Marco Ferreri

Special Awards
Golden Lion For Lifetime Achievement: Jean-Paul Belmondo and Jerzy Skolimowski
Jaeger-LeCoultre Glory to the Filmmaker Award: Amir Naderi
Persol Tribute To Visionary Talent Award: Liev Schreiber

Autonomous sections
The following official and collateral awards were conferred to films of the autonomous sections:

Venice International Critics' Week
 Lion of the Future
Luigi De Laurentiis Award for a Debut Film: The Last of Us (Akher wahed fina) by Ala Eddine Slim
 Audience Award - Circolo del Cinema di Verona: The Nobodies (Los nadie) by Juan Sebastián Mesa
 SIAE Award: Paolo Sorrentino
 Mario Serandrei - Hotel Saturnia Award: The Last of Us by Ala Eddine Slim

Venice Days
 Venice Days Award: The War Show by Andreas Dalsgaard and Obaidah Zytoon
 BNL Award: Pamilya ordinaryo by Eduardo Roy Jr.
 Brian Award: Worldly Girl (La ragazza del mondo) by Marco Danieli
 Fedeora Awards:
Best Film: The Road to Mandalay by Midi Z
Best Young Director: Amanda Kernell for Sami Blood
Best Actress: Ashleigh Cummings for Hounds Of Love
Best European Film: Quit Staring at My Plate (Ne gledaj mi u pijat) by Hana Jušić
 FEDIC Award: Indivisible (Indivisibili) by Edoardo De Angelis
 Gianni Astrei Award: Indivisible by Edoardo De Angelis
 Label Europa Cinema Award: Sami Blood (Sameblod) by Amanda Kernell
 Lizzani Award: Worldly Girl by Marco Danieli
 Lina Mangiacapre Award: Indivisible by Edoardo De Angelis
 MigrArti Award: No Borders by Haider Rashid
 Open Award: Open Prize: Vangelo by Pippo Delbono
 Francesco Pasinetti – SNGCI Award:
Best Film: Indivisible by Edoardo De Angelis
Best Actor: Michele Riondino for Worldly Girl
Best Actress: Sara Serraiocco for Worldly Girl
Special mention: Angela and Marianna Fontana for their roles in Indivisibili
 Queer Lion Award: Heartstone (Hjartasteinn) by Guðmundur Arnar Guðmundsson

Other collateral awards
The following collateral awards were conferred to films of the official selection:
 Arca CinemaGiovani Award:
Best Film (Main competition): Arrival by Denis Villeneuve
Best Italian Film (Biennale College - Cinema): Ears (Orecchie) by Alessandro Aronadio
 Civitas Vitae Award: Piuma by Roan Johnson
 FEDIC Award - Special mentions: 
The Greatest Dream (Il più grande sogno) by Michele Vannucci (Horizons)
Ears (Orecchie) by Alessandro Aronadio (Biennale College - Cinema)
 FIPRESCI Awards:
Best Film (Main competition): A Woman's Life by Stéphane Brizé
Best Film (Horizons): Kékszakállú by Gastón Solnicki
 Fondazione Mimmo Rotella AwardJames Franco (director) and Ambi Pictures (production) for In Dubious Battle
Paolo Sorrentino and Jude Law for the series The Young Pope (Out of competition)
Roan Johnson (director) and Lucky Red (distributor) for the film Piuma
Special Award for the production: Andrea Iervolino for In Dubious Battle (Il Cinema nel Giardino)
 Enrico Fulchignoni – CICT-UNESCO Award: Hotel Salvation (Mukti Bhawan)Shubhashish Bhutiani
 Future Film Festival Digital Award: Arrival by Denis Villeneuve
Special mention: Voyage of Time: Life's Journey by Terrence Malick
 Giovani Giurati del Vittorio Veneto Film Festival Award: The Distinguished Citizen (El ciudadano ilustre) by Gastón Duprat & Mariano Cohn
 Green Drop Award (ex aequo):
Spira Mirabilis by Massimo D’Anolfi and Martina Parenti
Voyage of Time: Life's Journey by Terrence Malick
 Human Rights Nights Special Award: Bitter Money (Ku qian) by Wang Bing (Horizons)
Special mention: Robinù by Michele Santoro (Il Cinema nel Giardino)
 Interfilm Award: White Sun (Seto Surya) by Deepak Rauniyar (Horizons)
 Lanterna Magica Award (CGS): Dark Night by Tim Sutton
 Leoncino d'Oro Agiscuola Award: On the Milky Road (Lungo la Via Lattea) by Emir Kusturica
Cinema for UNICEF mention: Paradise (Ray) by Andrei Konchalovsky
 Golden Mouse: Jackie by Pablo Larraín
 Silver Mouse: Austerlitz by Sergei Loznitsa (Out of competition)
 NuovoImaie Talent Award: 
Best Young Actor: Daniele Parisi for his role in Ears (Biennale College - Cinema)
Best Young Actress: Camilla Diana for Tommaso by Kim Rossi Stuart (Out of competition)
 Francesco Pasinetti Special Prize: the cast of Piuma by Roan Johnson
 Sfera 1932 Award: Spira Mirabilis by Massimo D’Anolfi and Martina Parenti
 SIGNIS Award: Piuma by Roan Johnson
Special mention: On the Milky Road by Emir Kusturica
 C. Smithers Foundation – CICT-UNESCO Award: The Bleeder by Philippe Falardeau (Out of Competition)
 Soundtrack Stars Award: Jovanotti for Summertime (L'estate addosso) by Gabriele Muccino (Il Cinema nel Giardino)
 Sorriso Diverso Venezia Award - Best Italian Film (ex aequo):
These Days (Questi giorni) by Giuseppe Piccioni
The Greatest Dream (Il più grande sogno) by Michele Vannucci (Horizons)
 Sorriso Diverso Venezia Award - Best Foreign Film: The Woman Who Left by Lav Diaz
 Padre Nazareno Taddei Award: Paradise by Andrei KonchalovskyOther Awards'''
 Kinèo Awards:
Best Film: Perfect Strangers directed by Paolo Genovese
Best Director: Daniele Luchetti for Call Me Francis Best Debut Director: Them who? directed by Francesco Micciché and Fabio Bonifacci 
SNCCI Audience and Critics Award: Roberto Andò for Le confessioniMovie&Art TaorminaFilmFest Award: Marco Giallini
RAI Com Award for Best Italian foreign release: They Call Me Jeeg directed by Gabriele Mainetti 
Best Movie Award: Gabriele Mainetti for They Call Me JeegExcellence Award: Patty Pravo
International Movie Award: Sophie Turner
Best Actor: Claudio Santamaria for They Call Me JeegBest Actress: Paola Cortellesi for The Last Will Be the LastSpecial Ferragamo Parfums Award for Best Actress: Anna Foglietta for Perfect Strangers Best Movie's poll for best film: The Last Will Be the Last directed by Massimiliano Bruno
Best Supporting Actor: Alessandro Borghi for SuburraBest Supporting Actress: Matilde Gioli for Belli di papà and  Un posto sicuroExcellence Award: Claudio Brachino
Excellence Award We World: Carolina Crescentini
Excellence Award: Laura Delli Colli
 3rd Starlight Cinema Awards'Career Award: Ottavia Piccolo
Career Award: Giancarlo De Cataldo 
International Award: Moon So-ri
Best Directorial Debut: Gabriele Mainetti for They Call Me JeegBest Actor: Claudio Santamaria for They Call Me JeegBest Short: La (ri) partenza directed by Milena Mancini and Vinicio Marchioni
Social Trend Topic Award: Tini, la nuova vita di Violetta''

References

External links

 
 Venice Film Festival 2016 Awards on IMDb

2016 festivals in Europe
2016 film festivals
2016 in Italian cinema
August 2016 events in Italy
September 2016 events in Italy
73
Film